The Ministry of Education, Science and Culture can refer to:
 Ministry of Education, Science and Culture (Austria)
 Ministry of Education, Science and Culture (Iceland)
 Ministry of Education, Science and Culture (Japan)
 Ministry of Education, Culture and Science (Netherlands)

See also
 Ministry of Education, Culture, Sports, Science and Technology (MEXT) of Japan, and the predecessor ministry Ministry of Education, Science, Sports and Culture (Monbusho)